Mertensophryne is a genus of true toads (family Bufonidae). They are found in eastern and southern Democratic Republic of Congo to Kenya, Tanzania, Malawi, southeastern Zimbabwe, and adjacent Mozambique. Their common names include snouted frogs, Chirinda forest toads, and forest toads. The genus is named for Robert Mertens, German zoologist and herpetologist.

Taxonomy
Mertensophryne, as currently understood, consist of the former "Bufo" taitanus group and the genera Mertensophryne (as formerly defined) and Stephopaedes. The latter is monophyletic and still recognized as a subgenus. The closest relatives of Mertensophryne remain uncertain but probably include Poyntonophrynus, Vandijkophrynus, and Capensibufo.

Description
Mertensophryne lack tympanum and columella. They frequently show digit reduction. Eggs are relatively large,  in diameter, and few in number (maximum 35–188).

Species
There are 14 recognized species:

References

 
Amphibian genera
Amphibians of Sub-Saharan Africa
Taxonomy articles created by Polbot